Legacy of Brutality is a compilation album of early songs by the American punk rock band Misfits, released in September 1985. It contains overdubbed mixes of previously unreleased songs, mainly from the January–February 1978 Static Age sessions. Besides The Misfits box set, this is the only official album containing the songs "Who Killed Marilyn?" and "American Nightmare".

This compilation was the first (aside from bootlegs) to release many of the then-unreleased Static Age songs to the public. Glenn Danzig, the songwriter, mixed and produced it, overdubbing new instrumentation.

Track listing

Credits 
 Glenn Danzig – vocals, guitar and bass on tracks 9, 10, and 13, piano on track 7, overdubbed guitar and bass on tracks 1–8, and 11, clapping on track 13
 Franché Coma – original guitar for tracks 1–8, and 11
 Bobby Steele – original guitar for tracks 9, 10 and 12
 Doyle Wolfgang von Frankenstein – original guitar on track 12, clapping on track 13
 Jerry Only – bass, clapping on track 13
 Mr. Jim – drums on tracks 1–8, and 11
 Joey Image – drums on tracks 9 and 10
 Arthur Googy – drums on tracks 12 and 13
 Rocky Caiafa – clapping on track 13

References 

Misfits (band) compilation albums
1989 compilation albums
Albums produced by Glenn Danzig
Caroline Records compilation albums
Plan 9 Records compilation albums